Hugh Graham Stack FRCS (7 December 1915 – 28 May 1992) was a British orthopaedic surgeon with a specialism in surgery of the hand. He was secretary of the Second Hand Club and was instrumental in the merger of the British hand surgery organisations to become the British Society for Surgery of the Hand.

Early life and education
Hugh Stack was born in Bristol on 7 December 1915, the third son of Edward H. E. Stack FRCS, an ophthalmic surgeon at the Bristol Royal Infirmary, and his wife Caroline, née Kennedy. He was educated at Clifton College, following which he received a scholarship to study chemistry at Bristol University. Three years later he switched career and enrolled at St Bartholemew's Hospital in London, to study medicine.

He married Lorna Cooke MRCP, in 1955. They had a daughter, Caroline, and a son, Charles, who became an anaesthetist.

Career
Stack first worked as a house surgeon at Addenbrooke's Hospital, the Royal National Orthopaedic Hospital and the Miller General Hospital, Greenwich, after which he served for two years in the Royal Navy Volunteer Reserve. He was then honorary demonstrator in anatomy at King's College, London, and subsequently a surgical registrar at the North Middlesex Hospital. He became a fellow of the Royal College of Surgeons in 1951 and from then on practised as an orthopaedic surgeon.

He then held appointments at the Miller Hospital and St. Bartholomew's Hospital, the Albert Dock Orthopaedic and Fracture Hospital, and the Harold Wood and Brentwood District Hospitals. It was while he was at St Bartholomew's that he became interested in reconstructive surgery of the hand in which he was influenced by Jackson Burrows, Osmond Clark, Norman Capener and Guy Pulvertaft.

In 1969, he wrote an influential article which highlighted the importance of naming the fingers (thumb, index, middle, ring, little) rather than numbering them (1, 2, 3, 4, 5), to avoid surgery on the wrong finger. In 1973, he was secretary of the Second Hand Club and was instrumental in the merger of the British hand surgery organisations to become the British Society for Surgery of the Hand. He was the first editor of The Hand, the forerunner of the Journal of Hand Surgery. He devised a splint for the management of soft tissue mallet fingers.

In 1970, he was elected Hunterian Professor by the Royal College of Surgeons of England.

Death and legacy
Stack died on 28 May 1992. The Graham Stack travelling fellowship is awarded in his memory.

Selected publications

Articles

 

, pp. 152–4.

"Second Hand Club", British Society for Surgery of the Hand, 1975, .

Lectures
 Arris and Gale Lecture: "A Study of Muscle Function in the Fingers", Royal College of Surgeons, 28 May 1963.
 Hunterian lecture: "The palmar fascia, and the development of deformities and displacemants in Dupuytren's contracture", Annals of the Royal College of Surgeons England. 1971.

Chapters
"Tumours" in R. Guy Pulvertaft (Ed.) Clinical Surgery: Volume 7 The Hand. Butterworths, 1966. pp. 208–228.

References

Further reading 

1915 births
1992 deaths
Fellows of the Royal College of Surgeons
Medical doctors from Bristol
British orthopaedic surgeons
People educated at Clifton College
Royal Naval Volunteer Reserve personnel
Alumni of the Medical College of St Bartholomew's Hospital
Alumni of the University of Bristol
History of surgery
20th-century surgeons